The 2019 Rugby Europe Sevens Olympic Qualifying Tournament was held on 13–14 July in Colomiers at Stade Michel Bendichou. The champion of the tournament, England, qualified on behalf of Great Britain for the European spot in the 2020 Summer Olympics. The two runners-up, France and Ireland, advance to the 2020 Olympic repechage tournament.

Teams

Twelve teams take part in the tournament, of which nine teams qualified through the 2019 Moscow Sevens, and are seeded according to their placements. The remaining three spots were awarded based upon performance in the Trophy and Conference tournaments.

Seedings

  (Moscow winner)
  (Moscow runner-up)
  (Moscow 3rd; for Great Britain)
  (Moscow 4th)
  (Moscow 6th)
  (Moscow 7th)
  (Moscow 8th)
  (Moscow 9th)
  (Moscow 10th)
  (Trophy winner)
  (Trophy runner-up)
  (Conference winner)

Note

Pool stage
All times in Central European Summer Time (UTC+02:00)

Pool A

Pool B

Pool C

Knockout stage

Cup

Plate

Bowl

Standings

External links
 Tournament page

References

Europe
2019 rugby sevens competitions
International rugby union competitions hosted by France
Rugby sevens competitions in Europe
2019–20 in French rugby union
July 2019 sports events in France